Sister Catherine "Kit" McNaughton (c.1887-1953) was an Australian nurse who served in World War I. She kept a detailed diary of her experiences.

Military service
Sister McNaughton was mentioned in despatches in 1917.

In popular culture
Kit McNaughton's diaries were the subject of the book Kitty's War written by Janet Butler.

Kit McNaughton was one of the six Australians whose war experiences were presented in The War That Changed Us, a four-part television documentary series about Australia's involvement in World War I.

McNaughton's war experiences also formed the basis of characters ANZAC Girls television series.

References

Further reading

External links
 

Australian military nurses
Australian diarists
Female nurses in World War I
20th-century Australian women writers
20th-century Australian writers
Women diarists